Swiggy is an Indian online food ordering and delivery platform. Founded in 2014, Swiggy is based in Bangalore and operates in 500 Indian cities as of September 2021. Besides food delivery, Swiggy also provides on-demand grocery deliveries under the name Instamart, and a same-day package delivery service called Swiggy Genie.

History 
In 2013, the two founders, Sriharsha Majety and Nandan Reddy, designed an e-commerce website called Bundl to facilitate courier service and shipping within India. Bundl was halted in 2014 and rebranded to enter the food delivery market. At the time, the food delivery sector was in turmoil as several notable startups, such as Foodpanda (later acquired by Ola Cabs), TinyOwl (later acquired by Zomato) and Ola Cafe (later closed) were struggling. Majety and Reddy approached Rahul Jaimini, formerly with Myntra, and founded Swiggy in August 2014.

In January 2017, Swiggy started its cloud kitchen chain called "The Bowl Company". In November 2017, Swiggy started a kitchen incubator business called Swiggy Access, opening a network of ready-to-occupy kitchens for its restaurant partners. By 2019, over 1,000 Swiggy Access kitchens were operational, according to a TechCrunch report.

In early 2019, Swiggy expanded into general product deliveries under the name Swiggy Stores, sourcing items from local stores. In September 2019, Swiggy launched instant pickup/dropoff service Swiggy Go, allowing customers to send document or parcel deliveries. In April 2020, it rebranded Swiggy Go as Swiggy Genie. During the COVID-19 pandemic, it began doorstep delivery of alcohol, starting with the states of Jharkhand, West Bengal and Odisha.

In May 2020, Swiggy laid off 1,100 employees during the COVID-19 pandemic. The pandemic also resulted in the shut down of more than three-fourths of its cloud kitchens.

In August 2020, Swiggy launched its instant grocery delivery service called Instamart using a network of dark stores. In early 2021, the company closed Swiggy Stores and expanded its operations under Instamart.

In 2023, it sold Swiggy Access kitchens to Kitchens@ in a share-swap deal.

Funding 
In 2015, Swiggy received a $2 million investment from Accel and SAIF Partners, along with additional investment from Norwest Venture Partners. The following year, it raised $15 million from both previous and new investors, including Bessemer Venture Partners and Harmony Partners.

In 2017, Naspers led an $80 million funding round into Swiggy.  By September 2018, Swiggy was valued around $3.3 billion, and in April 2020, Swiggy was valued around $3.6 billion.

In July 2021, Swiggy raised $1.25 billion from SoftBank, Prosus and other investors, at a valuation of $5.5 billion.

In January 2022, Swiggy's valuation rose to $10.7 billion after a $700-million fundraise led by US asset manager Invesco.

Acquisitions
In 2018, Swiggy acquired Mumbai-based Scootsy Logistics, a food and fashion delivery service, and ultimately shut it down in 2020.

In September 2018, it acquired Mumbai-based milk delivery startup SuprDaily.

In 2022, Swiggy acquired the dining and table reservation platform Dineout from Times Internet in an all-stock deal valued at $120 million.

Acqui-hires
In 2017, Swiggy acqui-hired Bangalore-based Asian food start-up 48East.

In 2019, the company acqui-hired the artificial intelligence startup Kint.io.

Other investments
In 2019, Swiggy, invested 31 crore in Mumbai-based ready-to-eat food brand Fingerlix.

 In 2022, Swiggy led a $180 million Series D investment round in bike taxi company Rapido.

Partnerships 
Swiggy has partnered with Burger King to provide delivery services. It has also partnered with Google Local Guide to facilitate customer reviews, and with Sodexo to let customers pay through meal cards. Swiggy launched a digital wallet, Swiggy Money, in partnership with ICICI Bank, an Indian private sector bank. In January 2022, Swiggy and drone company ANRA Technologies began trialing drone deliveries.

References

External links

Online marketplaces of India
Indian companies established in 2014
Retail companies established in 2014
Transport companies established in 2014
Internet properties established in 2014
Online food ordering
Companies based in Bangalore
2014 establishments in Karnataka
Privately held companies of India